Remote call can refer to:

 Remote procedure call 
 Open Network Computing Remote Procedure Call
 Remote call forwarding
 Remote Function Call